Andrew Brion Hogan Goddard (born February 26, 1975) is an American filmmaker. He began his career writing episodes for the television shows Buffy the Vampire Slayer, Angel, Alias, and Lost. After moving into screenwriting in film, he wrote Cloverfield (2008), World War Z (2013), and The Martian (2015), the latter earning him a nomination for the Academy Award for Best Adapted Screenplay. In 2011, he made his directorial debut with The Cabin in the Woods.

In 2015, Goddard created the Netflix series Daredevil. Soon after, he directed several episodes of The Good Place and served as an executive producer for 10 Cloverfield Lane (2016) and The Cloverfield Paradox (2018), the next installments in the Cloverfield franchise. His latest project, Bad Times at the El Royale (2018), starred an ensemble cast consisting of Jeff Bridges, Cynthia Erivo, Dakota Johnson, Jon Hamm, Cailee Spaeny, Lewis Pullman, and Chris Hemsworth.

Early life and education
Goddard was born in Houston, Texas and was raised in Los Alamos, New Mexico.  He attended Los Alamos High School and University of Colorado Boulder.

Career

2000s

Buffy the Vampire Slayer and Angel 

Goddard started his career as a staff writer for Buffy the Vampire Slayer and Angel, receiving a Hugo Award for Best Dramatic Presentation for the former.

Alias and Lost
In 2005, he joined J. J. Abrams' Bad Robot team, where he wrote for both Alias and Lost, winning—along with the Lost writing staff—the Writers Guild of America (WGA) Award for Best Dramatic Series. In 2006, during its third season, Goddard became the co-executive producer of Lost.

Cloverfield
By February 2007, Goddard wrote his first feature, Cloverfield, directed by Matt Reeves and produced by J. J. Abrams. Cloverfield made $168 million on a $25 million budget. Empire named it the fifth best film of 2008, and the film then went on to win the year's Saturn Award for Best Science Fiction Film.

2010s

The Cabin in the Woods
Goddard's directorial debut, The Cabin in the Woods, was co-written with Joss Whedon. The Cabin in the Woods was featured on Metacritic's best films of 2012 list, in addition to earning a 92% approval rating on Rotten Tomatoes. The film would go on to win the year's Saturn Award for Best Horror or Thriller Film, as well as garnering Goddard Saturn's "Filmmaker Showcase Award".

World War Z
In 2012, Goddard—in addition to J. Michael Straczynski, Matthew Michael Carnahan and Lost showrunner Damon Lindelof—rewrote the third act of the screenplay ahead of reshoots for the film World War Z starring Brad Pitt and directed by Marc Forster. The film grossed $540 million on a $190 million budget. As a result, in June 2013, Paramount announced that it was moving ahead with a sequel, though it was eventually scrapped.

Daredevil and The Defenders
In December 2013, Marvel officially announced that Goddard would be the executive producer and showrunner for the Daredevil television series produced by Marvel Television and broadcast on Netflix in 2015. Sony Pictures also announced that Goddard would write and direct a film based on the Sinister Six, though the project was eventually cancelled. In May 2014, Goddard withdrew from showrunning duties on the Daredevil TV series.

In February 2015, after the deal between Marvel and Sony to share the rights to Spider-Man was announced, it was reported that Goddard was in talks with Sony to helm the new Spider-Man reboot film, Spider-Man: Homecoming, although it was later announced that Jon Watts would be the director. Goddard also executive produced and co-wrote an episode of the miniseries The Defenders. The series featured a team-up of the Marvel Television superheroes, including Daredevil. It was released on Netflix in August 2017.

The Martian
Goddard wrote the film adaptation of Andy Weir's debut novel The Martian, initially planning to direct it himself for 20th Century Fox. He later left the project when offered a chance to direct Sinister Six, a now-canceled comic book adaptation based on a team of supervillains. The Martian was instead directed by Ridley Scott, and received wide critical acclaim. Goddard himself received an Academy Award nomination for Best Adapted Screenplay.

Bad Times at the El Royale

In November 2016, Goddard began writing a spec script for the neo-noir thriller film Bad Times at the El Royale, which he sold to 20th Century Fox in March 2017, revealing he would also produce and direct. The film features an ensemble cast including Jeff Bridges, Cynthia Erivo, Dakota Johnson, Jon Hamm, Nick Offerman, and Chris Hemsworth.

Potential projects 
A film based on the Sinister Six was announced to be in development in December 2013, as part of Sony's plans for their own The Amazing Spider-Man shared universe, with Goddard attached to write and potentially direct. Goddard confirmed his intention to direct the film in April 2014. The film was believed to have been canceled by November 2015 when Sony was focusing on its new Spider-Man reboot with Marvel Studios, but producer Amy Pascal stated that the film was "alive" again in December 2018 following the success of Venom, and that she was waiting for Goddard to be ready to direct it before moving forward with the project, now to be set in the Sony Pictures Universe of Marvel Characters.

In May 2016, Goddard was reported to be writing the screenplay for a film adaptation of the novel Wraiths Of The Broken Land, with Ridley Scott set to direct. By October 2017 he was also attached to write and produce Nevermoor: The Trials of Morrigan Crow, a film adaptation of the novel of the same name. In June 2020 he was also announced to be attached to Project Hail Mary, based on the novel of the same name, with Phil Lord and Christopher Miller set to direct. From 2019 to now, his company, Goddard Textiles struck an overall deal with Disney Television Studios via 20th Century Fox Television (now 20th Television) and ABC Signature. In December 2022, FX ordered a pilot for The Trenches, a half-hour animated series created by Goddard. In January 2023, it was revealed Goddard had joined a writers' room assembled by James Gunn to map out the overarching story of the DC Universe.

Filmography

Film

Executive producer
 The Martian (2015)
 10 Cloverfield Lane (2016)
 The Cloverfield Paradox (2018)

Television

Bibliography
Tales of the Vampires (Dark Horse Comics, collected in trade paperback, Tales of the Vampires, 144 pages, December 2004, Buffy the Vampire Slayer: Tales, 288 pages, January 2011):
 "The Problem With Vampires" (with artist Paul Lee, in Tales of the Vampires #1, Dark Horse Comics, December 2003)
 "Antique" (with artist Ben Stenbeck, in Tales of the Vampires #3, Dark Horse Comics, February 2004)
Buffy the Vampire Slayer Season Eight #12–15: "Wolves at the Gate" (with pencils by Georges Jeanty and inks by Andy Owens, Dark Horse Comics, March–June 2008, tpb, Buffy The Vampire Slayer Season 8, Volume 3: Wolves at the Gate, 136 pages, November 2008)

See also
 Mutant Enemy Productions

References

External links

 
 Drew Goddard talks 'The Cabin in the Woods from CriticizeThis.ca
Scripts & Scribes Podcast Interview with Drew Goddard

1975 births
American male screenwriters
Television producers from Texas
Living people
Writers from New Mexico
Writers Guild of America Award winners
Horror film directors
Hugo Award-winning writers
People from Los Alamos, New Mexico
American male television writers
Writers from Houston
Screenwriters from Texas
Screenwriters from New Mexico
University of Colorado Boulder alumni
Film directors from Texas
Film producers from Texas
Film directors from New Mexico
American television directors
21st-century American screenwriters